Barbara Seaman (September 11, 1935 – February 27, 2008) was an American author, activist, and journalist, and a principal founder of the women's health feminism movement.

Early years
Seaman, whose parents, Henry J. Rosner and Sophie Kimels, met at a Young People's Socialist League (1907) picnic, grew up in a politically progressive milieu (Pete Seeger sang at her nursery school when she was four years old).

When she was in high school, Seaman won a contest for her writing and the prize was dinner with Eleanor Roosevelt, according to a 1997 interview of Seaman by author/attorney Karen Winner.

Seaman was sensitized at an early age to women's health issues when her aunt Sally died of endometrial cancer in 1959, aged 49. Her aunt's oncologist attributed her death to Premarin, which her gynecologist had prescribed for the relief of menopausal symptoms.

Writings and activism
When the birth control pill came on the market in 1960, Barbara was writing columns for women's magazines such as Brides and the Ladies' Home Journal. She launched her career as a women's health journalist and brought a new kind of health reporting to the field, writing articles that centered more on the patient and less on the medical fads of the day. Seaman was first to reveal that women lacked the information they needed to make informed decisions on child-bearing, breast-feeding, and oral contraceptives.  She even went so far as to alert women to the dangers of the Pill, whose primary ingredient was estrogen (also the active ingredient in Premarin, which had contributed to the death of her aunt). Prolific output and the popularity of her published articles won Seaman membership with the prestigious Society of Magazine Writers. Through this organization she met Betty Friedan, who asked her to cover events such as the founding of NOW (1966), the founding of NARAL (1969), and other similarly important feminist developments. She was also befriended by Gloria Steinem and became a contributing editor at Ms. magazine.

In tandem with her writing activities, Seaman was also a political organizer. She was a founding member of the New York Women's Forum (1973), vice president of the New York City Women's Medical Center (1971), and sat on the advisory board of the New York chapter of the National Organization for Women (1973).

In 1969, she completed her first book, The Doctors' Case Against the Pill, which would become the basis for the Nelson Pill Hearings on the safety of the combined oral contraceptive pill. As a result of the hearings, a health warning was added to the pill, the first informational insert for any prescription drug. Robert Finch, Secretary of HEW, praised Seaman saying, "The Doctors' Case Against the Pill... was a major factor in our strengthening the language in the final warning published in the Federal Register to be included in each package of the Pill." The dramatic events surrounding the hearings also brought together many soon-to-be prominent health feminists for the first time, and encouraged them to pursue further action. In 1975 Seaman co-founded the National Women's Health Network with Alice Wolfson, Belita Cowan, Mary Howell (M.D.) and Phyllis Chesler (PhD).

Also in 1975, Seaman made "Four Demands"—a speech at Harvard Medical School in which she demanded that more women be admitted to training in obstetrics and gynecology. At the time, the number was barely 3%. Another demand was that women have a say in how research money concerning female reproduction be spent.

Health Feminist Hub
Seaman was an enthusiastic promoter of other writers on women's health and body issues. In a piece published in The New York Times on December 2, 1972, she wrote "Some women want to let their doctors do the worrying for them. But for those of us who don't, it has been extremely difficult to get honest health information." Seaman went on to praise and introduce a new library of women's self-help books, including Our Bodies, Ourselves;    
Women and Madness; Why Natural Childbirth; and Vaginal Politics. More recently, she has helped to write major obituaries for her fellow activists in the women's health movement, including Dr. Mary Howell and Lorraine Rothman.

Commercial censorship
Due to her criticism of the birth control pill and other commercially important pharmaceutical products, Seaman was fired, blacklisted, and censored on numerous occasions including dismissals from Ladies Home Journal, Family Circle, Omni and Hadassah magazines.

U.S. Representative Carolyn Maloney, in the Congressional Record (October 17, 2005), stated that "In the 1980s Barbara was essentially blacklisted from magazines by pharmaceutical companies who would not advertise in publications that carried her stories. Her relentless insistence on questioning the safety and effectiveness of their products earned her their condemnation and our praise. Barbara took advantage of this forced lull by turning to biography."

During the 1980s, Seaman published Lovely Me, a biography of Jacqueline Susann, which was made into a television movie, Scandalous Me, starring Michele Lee.

Final years
Seaman lived in New York City, close to her three children, four grandchildren, two sisters, and two nephews.

Until the end of her life, she was writing articles and advocating for women's safety and participation in their own medical treatment. Seaman continued to write about hormonal contraceptives, childbirth, and the unwillingness of some doctors and pharmaceutical companies to disclose risks to patients and consumers.  On February 27, 2008, Seaman died of lung cancer.

In June 2000, The New York Times published a piece by Seaman, "The Pill and I: 40 Years On, the Relationship Remains Wary".

She collaborated with Laura Eldridge on two books, The No Nonsense Guide to Menopause released in 2008 (Simon & Schuster) and Voices of the Women's Health Movement (Seven Stories Press) to be published in January 2012.

In 2009 the 40th anniversary edition of the Doctors' Case Against the Pill was published.

Education
 BA (Ford Foundation scholar), Oberlin College, 1956
 Honorary LHD, Oberlin College, 1978
 Certificate in advanced science writing (Sloan-Rockefeller Science Writing Fellowship), Columbia University School of Journalism, 1968

Writings

Magazines
 Frequent contributor to The New York Times and The Washington Post
 Either a columnist or contributing editor at Ms. magazine, Omni, Ladies' Home Journal, Hadassah
 Bride's and Family Circle

Books
 The Doctor's Case Against the Pill (1969)
 Free and Female (1972)
 Women and the Crisis in Sex Hormones (1977) (with Gideon Seaman, M.D.)
 Lovely Me: The Life of Jacqueline Susann (1987)
 The Greatest Experiment ever Performed on Women: Exploding the Estrogen Myth (2003)
 For Women Only: Your Guide to Health Empowerment with Gary Null (2000)

Contributor to many books, including: 
 Career and Motherhood (1979)
 Rooms with No View (1974)
 Women and Men (1975)
 Seizing our Bodies (1978)
 Voices of the Women's Health Movement, Volumes 1 & 2 (Seven Stories Press, 2012)

Contributor to several plays and documentaries, including: 
 I am a Woman (1972)
 Taking Our Bodies Back (1974)
 The American Experience Presents the Pill (2003)

Honors
In 2000, Seaman was named by the US Postal Service as an honoree of the 1970s Women's Rights Movement stamp. Winner of Matrix Award in Books, 1978.

References

Sources

 Baker, Christina Looper & and Kline, Christina Baker. The Conversation Begins: Mothers and Daughters Talk About Living Feminism, Bantam Books, 1996. .
 Seaman, Barbara. "The Greatest Experiment Ever Performed on Women", Hyperion, 2003. .
 Science Magazine, article by Charles Mann entitled "Women¹s Health Research Blossoms" (August 11, 1995)
 Barbara Seaman, Jewish Women's Archive series on Jewish Women and the Feminist Revolution (JWA)
 Boxer, Sarah. "The Contraception Conundum: It's Not Just Birth Control Anymore", The New York Times, June 22, 1997
 "A Dozen Who Have Risen to Prominence", The New York Times, 1997
 Levine, Suzanne Braun Inventing the Rest of Our Lives: Women in Second Adulthood (New York: Viking, 2005)
 Seaman, Barbara, "Dear Injurious Physician", The New York Times, December 2, 1972, p. 32 (an early plugs for the commercial edition of Our Bodies, Ourselves, which had previously been an underground pamphlet)
 Nathan, Linda K., "The First Lady Of Women’s Health", Jewish Week, October 6, 2004
 Science Magazine, "Women's Health Research Blossoms", August 11, 1995
 Love, Barbara J. & Kott, Nancy F., "Feminists who Changed America, 1963–1975", University of Illinois Press, 2006.

External links

 "PBS American Experience: The Pill"
 "Barbara Seaman: Muckraker for Women's Health", Women's eNews
 Barbara Seaman biography at WebMD
 Biodata on Barbara Seaman
 Barbara Seaman quotes
 Barbara Seaman Papers, 1920–1983: A Finding Aid.Schlesinger Library, Radcliffe Institute, Harvard University.
 Additional papers of Barbara Seaman, 1933–2008 (inclusive), 1966–2006 (bulk): A Finding Aid.Schlesinger Library, Radcliffe Institute, Harvard University.
 New York Times obituary

1935 births
2008 deaths
Jewish American journalists
American women journalists
American women's rights activists
Deaths from lung cancer in New York (state)
Oberlin College alumni
American health activists
20th-century American non-fiction writers
20th-century American women writers
20th-century American Jews
21st-century American Jews
21st-century American women